Ahmed Saad Al Rashidi (born 18 June 1984) was a Kuwaiti footballer.

International goals

References

1984 births
Living people
Kuwaiti footballers
Kuwait international footballers
2011 AFC Asian Cup players
Association football defenders
Al-Arabi SC (Kuwait) players
Al-Shabab SC (Kuwait) players
Al-Nasr SC (Kuwait) players
Kuwait Premier League players
Al Tadhamon SC players